Heliophanus parvus is a species of jumping spider in the genus Heliophanus that lives on the Socotra Archipelago off the coast of Yemen. It was first described in 1994.

References

Spiders described in 1994
Fauna of Socotra
Salticidae
Spiders of Asia